Thioproperazine, sold under the brand name Majeptil, is a typical antipsychotic  of the phenothiazine group which is used as a tranquilizer, antiemetic, sedative, and in the treatment of schizophrenia and manic phase of bipolar disorder. Majeptil is available in 10 mg tablets.

Side effects 
Common

 Extrapyramidal symptoms
 Amenorrhea
 Decreased sexual interest and/or function
 Swelling of breasts and milk production in males and females
 Difficulty sleeping
 Constipation
 Reduced amount of urine
 Dizziness
 Drowsiness
 Dry mouth
 Nausea
 Headache
 Weight changes

Rare but potentially serious adverse effects

 Agranulocytosis
 Neuroleptic Malignant Syndrome (NMS)
 Sudden cardiac death
 Torsades de pointes

Elderly individuals with dementia-related psychosis treated with antipsychotic medication are at an increased risk of death compared to individuals not receiving antipsychotics.

Drug interactions 
Medications for allergies (e.g., Benadryl diphenhydramine), certain medications for sleep (e.g., lorazepam, zopiclone), certain medications for pain (e.g., fentanyl), and Antiparkinson medications can increase the sedative effect of thioproperazine and can be potentially dangerous when used together.

Synthesis

Thioether formation between 2-Aminothiophenol (1) and 4-Chloro-N,N-Dimethyl-3-Nitrobenzenesulfonamide [137-47-3] (2) gives 4-(2-aminophenyl)sulfanyl-N,N-dimethyl-3-nitrobenzenesulfonamide [5510-56-5] (3). Sandmeyer reaction with cuprous bromide [7787-70-4] gave 4-[(2-Bromophenyl)-thio]-N,N'-dimethyl-3-nitro-benzenesulfonamide [5510-58-7] (4). Bechamp reduction  gave 3-Amino-4-((2-bromophenyl)thio)-N,N-dimethylbenzenesulphonamide [5592-64-3] (5). Goldberg reaction completed the formation of the phenothiazine ring and gave N,N-dimethyl-10H-phenothiazine-2-sulfonamide [1090-78-4] (6). Attachment of the sidechain by sodamide reaction with 1-(3-Chloropropyl)-4-Methylpiperazine [104-16-5] (7) completes the synthesis of Thioproperazine (8), respectively.

References

Phenothiazines
Piperazines
Sulfonamides
Typical antipsychotics